This is a list of municipalities in Morocco which have standing links to local communities in other countries known as "town twinning" (usually in Europe) or "sister cities" (usually in the rest of the world).

A
Agadir

 Gaza City, Palestine
 Hangzhou, China
 Pleven, Bulgaria
 Portsmouth, United States

Ahfir
 Hérouville-Saint-Clair, France

Asilah

 Albuñol, Spain
 Sintra, Portugal

B
Berkane

 Bondy, France
 Perpignan, France
 Saint-Gilles, Belgium
 Zeist, Netherlands

Berrechid
 Çekmeköy, Turkey

C
Casablanca

 Bordeaux, France
 Busan, South Korea
 Chicago, United States
 Dakar, Senegal
 Dubai, United Arab Emirates
 Jakarta, Indonesia
 Kuala Lumpur, Malaysia
 Muscat, Oman
 Nouadhibou, Mauritania
 Shanghai, China

Chefchaouen

 Dijon, France
 Issaquah, United States
 Kunming, China

D
Deroua
 Ümraniye, Turkey

E
Essaouira

 Changshu, China
 La Rochelle, France

F
Fez

 Bobo-Dioulasso, Burkina Faso
 Chengdu, China
 Coimbra, Portugal
 Córdoba, Spain
 East Jerusalem, Palestine
 Florence, Italy
 Jericho, Palestine
 Kairouan, Tunisia
 Kraków, Poland
 Lahore, Pakistan
 Montpellier, France
 Saint-Louis, Senegal

 Suwon, South Korea
 Wuxi, China
 Xi'an, China

Figuig
 Stains, France

H
El Hajeb
 Council Bluffs, United States

Al Hoceima

 Albuñol, Spain
 Sint-Niklaas, Belgium

I
Ifrane
 Albuñol, Spain

J
El Jadida

 Arenzano, Italy
 Barcelos, Portugal
 Nabeul, Tunisia
 Sète, France
 Sintra, Portugal
 Varennes, Canada
 Vierzon, France
 Tacoma, United States

K
Kenitra

 Bergerac, France
 Gaziantep, Turkey
 Hammam-Lif, Tunisia
 Karatay, Turkey
 Sancaktepe, Turkey
 Santa Maria da Feira, Portugal
 Santos, Brazil
 Tavira, Portugal

Ksar el-Kebir
 Lagos, Portugal

L
Larache
 Compiègne, France

M
Marrakesh

 Granada, Spain
 Marseille, France
 Ningbo, China
 Scottsdale, United States
 Sousse, Tunisia
 Timbuktu, Mali

M'diq
 Frontignan, France

Meknes

 Cenon, France
 Nîmes, France
 Santarém, Portugal
 Tulkarm, Palestine

Mohammedia

 Ghent, Belgium
 Oeiras, Portugal

Moulay Yacoub
 Aix-les-Bains, France

O
Ouarzazate
 Maubeuge, France

Oujda

 East Jerusalem, Palestine
 Grenoble, France
 Lille, France
 Molenbeek-Saint-Jean, Belgium
 Trowbridge, England, United Kingdom

R
Rabat

 Bethlehem, Palestine
 Cairo, Egypt
 Guangzhou, China
 Honolulu, United States
 Istanbul, Turkey
 Lisbon, Portugal
 Lyon, France
 Madrid, Spain
 Nablus, Palestine

 Tunis, Tunisia

S
Safi

 Boulogne-sur-Mer, France
 Montereau-Fault-Yonne, France
 Salaberry-de-Valleyfield, Canada
 Setúbal, Portugal
 Sfax, Tunisia

Salé

 Aryanah, Tunisia
 Beitunia, Palestine
 Gandiaye, Senegal
 Grand Yoff, Senegal
 Maroua, Cameroon
 Portalegre, Portugal
 Tlaxcala de Xicohténcatl, Mexico

Settat

 La Celle-Saint-Cloud, France
 Yinchuan, China

Skhirat
 Betz, France

T
Tangier

 Algeciras, Spain
 Bizerte, Tunisia
 Cádiz, Spain
 Da Nang, Vietnam
 Faro, Portugal
 Liège, Belgium
 Metz, France
 Puteaux, France
 Saint-Denis, Réunion, France
 Saint-Josse-ten-Noode, Belgium
 Santiago, Chile
 Sétif, Algeria

Tétouan

 Granada, Spain
 Khan Yunis, Palestine
 Monastir, Tunisia
 Terrassa, Spain

Tiznit

 İzmit, Turkey
 Saint-Denis, France
 Somerville, United States

Z
Zagora
 Chapelle-lez-Herlaimont, Belgium

References

Morocco
Foreign relations of Morocco
Morocco geography-related lists
Cities in Morocco
Populated places in Morocco